Baiker is town and union council of Dera Bugti District in the Balochistan province of Pakistan. In 2006 the government of Pakistan announced that it was investing in various project in Balochistan including the Baiker area.

References

Populated places in Dera Bugti District
Union councils of Balochistan, Pakistan